The Guangzhou Metro ( and ) is the rapid transit system of the city of Guangzhou in Guangdong Province of China. It is operated by the state-owned Guangzhou Metro Corporation and was the fourth metro system to be built in mainland China, after those of Beijing, Tianjin, and Shanghai.

The earliest efforts to build an underground rapid transit system in Guangzhou date back to 1960. In the two decades that followed, the project was brought into the agenda five times but ended up abandoned each time due to financial and technical difficulties. Preparation of what would lead to today's Guangzhou Metro did not start until the 1980s, and it was not until 1993 that construction of the first line, Line 1, officially began. Line 1 opened four years later in 1997 with five stations in operation.

, Guangzhou Metro has 16 lines in operation, namely: Line 1, Line 2, Line 3, Line 4, Line 5, Line 6, Line 7, Line 8, Line 9, Line 13, Line 14, Line 18, Line 21, Line 22, Guangfo Line, and Zhujiang New Town APM reaching both the urban core and surrounding suburbs. Guangfo Line connects Guangzhou and Foshan and is the first metro line between two cities in the country. Daily service hours start at 6:00 am and end at midnight and daily ridership averages over 7 million. Having delivered 3.029 billion rides in 2018, Guangzhou Metro is the third busiest metro system in the world and the 3rd largest in terms of length, after the metro systems of Beijing and Shanghai.

Extensive development of the metro network has been planned for the next decade, with construction started on Line 10, Line 11, and Line 12, and extensions of Line 3, Line 5, Line 8, Line 13, and Line 14, Line 18, Line 22, as well as the extension of Line 7 into Shunde District of Foshan.

History

Forays of the 1960s and 1970s 

Chen Yu, Governor of Guangdong in 1957–1967, was the first to have proposed an underground metro system for Guangzhou. In the summer of 1960, he ordered a secret geological survey of groundwater levels of Guangzhou. The geological conditions of Guangzhou, despite their complexity, did not preclude the possibility of an underground metro system. Analysis of the survey data resulted in a confidential report titled Geological Survey for Guangzhou Underground Railway Project dated July 1961, the earliest one of such reports.

In 1965, Chen Yu along with Tao Zhu, who had been the Governor of Guangdong and First Secretary of Guangdong Committee of the Chinese Communist Party, proposed in the wake of the Gulf of Tonkin incident that a tunnel is built in Guangzhou for wartime evacuations and post-war metro development. Approved by the central government, the project started in the spring of 1965. Due to its confidentiality in the context of intensification of the Vietnam War, the project adopted the obscure name of "Project Nine", where "Nine" was the number of strokes in "", the Chinese word for "underground".

As envisaged by Chen Yu, the metro system of Guangzhou would consist of two lines: a north–south line that would connect Nanfang Building to Sanyuanli via Renmin Lu and Jiefang Beilu, and an east–west line that would run from Xichang to Dongshan along today's Dongfeng Lu. The two lines roughly parallelled Line 2 and Line 1 of the modern days, respectively. The east-west line was never built, while Project Nine was dedicated to the north–south line. Over ten teams of miners were recruited for a project filled with hazards and perils. Constrained by extreme scarcity of time, monetary and material resources, the ambition to build a tunnel for the metro operation was scaled back— the capability to run trolleybuses was deemed acceptable. The tunnel was planned to be used as an air-raid shelter and eventual metro line; however, with a cross-section merely 3 m wide and 2.85 m tall, and exposed rocks and wooden trestles scattered everywhere, it was unusable for public transit. In the two decades that followed, four attempts were made to revive and expand Project Nine, first in 1970, next in 1971, then in 1974, and last in 1979. Due to lack of funds and complex geotechnical conditions, none of these efforts materialized.

Construction of Line 1 
The metro project of Guangzhou was launched for the sixth time in 1984 as the Preparation Office of Guangzhou Metro, established back in 1979 as part of the last attempt to resurrect Project Nine, was moved out of the civil air-defense system and became a subordinate body of the Construction Commission of Guangzhou, bringing Guangzhou Metro into the scope of urban infrastructure development. Before the 1980s, war preparedness was the dominant tenet of underground infrastructure projects in mainland China. The construction of Guangzhou Metro marked the first deviation from the old doctrine as traffic itself became the prime consideration of the project.

The design of the initial metro network was a collaborative effort between China and France (SYSTRA). Four tentative designs were published on 14 March 1988 edition of Guangzhou Daily. From the four designs, one was selected based on expert and mass feedback. The selected design, featuring two intersecting lines, was the baseline typology for today's Line 1 and Line 2.

Construction of Line 1 officially commenced on 28 December 1993, although work on a trial section at Huangsha had begun in October 1992, five months before the feasibility study of the line was ratified by the State Planning Commission in March 1993. Various technologies novel to China's construction industry at the time were adopted in different sections of the project, notably including immersed tubes (Pearl River Tunnel) and tunnel boring machines (Huangsha–Martyrs' Park section). As the most massive urban infrastructure project in the history of Guangzhou, Line 1 required funding of ¥12.75 billion, all of which was raised by the local government. Use of cut-and-cover tunnels aggressively backed by then-mayor Li Ziliu necessitated the relocation of approximately 100,000 residents in 20,000 households and demolition of buildings totalling  in the area and earned Li the nickname "Li the Demolisher".

Three and a half years after construction started, the  section from Xilang to Huangsha opened for trial operation on 28 June 1997. The remaining , from Huangsha to Guangzhou East railway station, was completed eighteen months later on 28 December 1998. The entire line opened for sightseeing tours between 16 February and 2 March 1999, delivering 1.39 million rides 15 days before closing for final testing. Operation of Line 1 officially began on 28 June 1999, 34 years after the start of Project Nine in 1965.

Accelerated expansion in the 2000s 

The success of Line 1 as a turnkey project acquired from Siemens with 100% imported electromechanical equipment prompted a wave of similar proposals from twelve other cities in mainland China toward the end of the 1990s. The fever for import-centric rapid transit caused the State Planning Committee to temporarily halt approval of rapid transit projects nationwide and regulate the localization rates of rolling stock suppliers. Amid tightened regulation, only Line 2 of Guangzhou Metro received the immediate green light to proceed in June 1998 on the condition that at least 60% of its electromechanical equipment must be sourced domestically.

Construction of Line 2 started in July 1998. Rolling stock manufacturer Bombardier airlifted the first two train cars in an An-124 from Berlin to Guangzhou in November 2002 after schedule delays. The first section, from Sanyuanli to Xiaogang opened on 29 December 2002; the remaining section from Xiaogang to Pazhou opened on 28 June 2003. At ¥2.13 billion, the equipment cost of Line 2 was 53% lower than that of Line 1. This demonstrated the feasibility of cost reduction through procurement of domestic equipment, revealing a path to project approval to other Chinese cities and reigniting their aspirations to own a rapid transit system.

The renewed craze for rapid transit across the country soon encountered a new round of tightened control on project approval around 2003. But Guangzhou was exempted along with Beijing, Shanghai and Shenzhen. By the time Line 2 was completed, construction of Line 3, Line 4, and Guangfo Line had been underway, among which only Guangfo Line later fell to stringent regulation of approvals.

Lines in operation

Line 1 

Except for Kengkou and Xilang, all stations in Line 1 are underground. Its first section, from Xilang to Huangsha, opened on 28 June 1997, making Guangzhou the fourth city in mainland China to have a metro system. The full line started operation two years later on 28 June 1999. Line 1's color is yellow.

Line 2 

Line 2 is a north–south line that runs from Jiahewanggang to Guangzhou South railway station. Until 21 September 2010, it ran from Sanyuanli to Wanshengwei. Its first section, between Sanyuanli and Xiaogang, opened on 29 December 2002. It was extended from Xiaogang to Pazhou on 28 June 2003 and further to Wanshengwei a year later. The section between Xiaogang and Wanshengwei was split off to form part of Line 8 during 22–24 September 2010, when the operation was paused. The latest extension, from Jiangnanxi to Guangzhou South railway station and from Sanyuanli to Jiahewanggang, opened on 25 September 2010 as the whole line resumed operation. All stations in Line 2 are underground. Line 2's color is deep blue.

Line 3 

Line 3 is a  Y-shaped line connecting Airport North and Tianhe Coach Terminal to Panyu Square. All stations in the line are underground. When the line opened on 26 December 2005, trains operated between Guangzhou East railway station and Kecun. Following completion of the Tianhe Coach Terminal–Tiyu Xilu and Kecun–Panyu Square sections, the line was rerouted on 30 December 2006 to offer transfer-free connections between Panyu Square and Tianhe Coach Terminal via Tiyu Xilu. The Guangzhou East railway station–Tiyu Xilu section became a shuttle until it was extended northwards to Airport South on 30 October 2010. In official distinctions, the main route consists of the entire Tianhe Coach Terminal–Panyu Square section, while the Airport South–Tiyu Xilu section is a spur line. The spur line will be split off in the long term to form part of Line 10. Line 3 had been notorious for its crowding since it opened, for it ran three-car trains. That was partly relieved when all three-car trains started operating as six-car ones, connected in sets of two, on 28 April 2010. Sectional services between Tonghe to Dashi are added from 7:30 to 8:30 every workday, partly solving the capacity issues. Despite these changes, as of 2018, the line is still severely overcrowded. Line 3's color is bright orange.

Line 4 

Line 4 is a north-south line running parallel to Line 2 along the east of the city. The section of the line from Huangcun to Xinzao, Feishajiao to Nansha Passenger Port are built underground, while that from Xinzao to Jinzhou is built at the elevated track. It was the first metro line in mainland China to use linear motor trains. Its first section, from Wanshengwei to Xinzao, opened on 26 December 2005. Southwards, it was extended from Xinzao to Huangge on 30 December 2006 and further to Jinzhou on 28 June 2007. Northwards, it was extended to Chebeinan on 28 December 2009. Southwards, it extended from Chebeinan to Huangcun, opened on 25 September 2010. Its latest extension, from Huangcun to Nansha Passenger Port, opened on 27 December 2017. Line 4's color is green.

Line 5 

It entered operation on 28 December 2009. All stations in the line except Jiaokou and Tanwei are underground. Until Line 8 was split off from Line 2, it was the only line that interchanged with all other lines. Similar to Line 4, Line 5 also uses linear motor trains. Line 5's color is red.

Line 6 

It began service on 28 December 2013 and contains three elevated stations along the route. The line runs four-car trains, but stations of the east extension starting with South China Botanical Garden will be constructed with a provision to accommodate six-car trains in preparation for a route split in the future. Line 6's color is maroon.

Line 7 

The first phase of Line 7 began service on 28 December 2016 and runs from Guangzhou South railway station to Higher Education Mega Center South in Panyu District throughout  when completed. Six-car trains are used. All nine stations are underground. Line 7's color is light green.

Line 8 

The first section of Line 8, from Xiaogang to Wanshengwei, opened in 2002 and ran as part of Line 2 until the extension to the line was completed in September 2010. Line 8 ran from Fenghuang Xincun to Wanshengwei. The section from Changgang to Wanshengwei opened on 25 September 2010 when the split-off from Line 2 was complete. The section west of Changgang did not open until 3 November 2010 due to disputes over the environmental impact of the cooling facilities at Shayuan. The remaining section from Fenghuang Xincun to Cultural Park and Cultural Park to Jiaoxin are opened on 28 December 2019 and 26 November 2020 separately. Line 8's color is teal.

Line 9 

The line, other than Qingtang station, went operational on 28 December 2017. Line 9 mainly serves as a link for the passengers of Huadu District and Guangzhou North railway station to the rest of the system, having only one transfer station with Line 3 at Gaozeng. After the Tianhe Coach Terminal–Tiyu Xilu spur line of Line 3 is split off to form part of Line 10, the line is expected to be connected into Line 3 using the reserved switches at Gaozeng to become a new spur line. Line 9's color is pale green.

Line 13 

Opened on 28 December 2017, Line 13 is the first metro line in Guangzhou built to run eight-car trains. The currently operating  first phase runs from Yuzhu to Xinsha, serving passengers of Huangpu and Xintang, Zengcheng. The eleven-station line currently has only one transfer station with Line 5 at Yuzhu. The second phase of Line 13 runs west of the current phase, which cuts through popular areas of Huangpu, Tianhe, and Liwan Districts, and is currently under construction. Line 13's color is olive.

Line 14 

Two sections of Line 14 are currently in service. The branch line operates primarily within Huangpu and mainly connects the Sino-Chinese Knowledge City to Zhenlong. The mainline segment to Conghua opened a year later on 28 December 2018 and runs from Jiahewanggang in Baiyun District to Dongfeng in Conghua. A southward extension to Guangzhou railway station is currently under construction. Line 14 is the first line in Guangzhou Metro that offers express services. Line 14's color is brown.

Line 18 

The section is 58.3 km in length. Line 18's color is blue.

Line 21 

The section from Yuancun to Tianhe Park is intended as part of Line 11 and constructed to accommodate the eight-car trains of the latter. When the construction of Line 11 is completed, this section will be operated as part of Line 11, making Tianhe Park the west end of Line 21. Express service was also provided after the inauguration of the western section (Yuancun – Zhenlongxi). Line 21's color is dark purple.

Line 22 

The section is 18.2 km in length. Line 22's color is orange.

Guangfo Line 

The Guangzhou–Foshan Section of Pearl River Delta Region Intercity Rapid Transit is an intercity metro line that connects Guangzhou and Foshan. It is commonly known as Guangfo Metro and Guangfo Line of Guangzhou Metro. The section within Foshan also doubles as Line 1 of FMetro (Foshan Metro). The line is operated by Guangdong Guangfo Inter-City Co., Ltd., a subsidiary co-owned by Guangzhou Metro (51%) and Foshan Metro (49%). Eleven of the stations are located in Foshan, while the other three are in Guangzhou. Relocation disputes at Lijiao were not resolved until October 2013 and have delayed completion of the extension from Xilang to Lijiao till December 2015. The line runs four-car trains. All its stations are underground.

Zhujiang New Town APM Line 

The Automated People Mover System of Zhujiang New Town Core District Municipal Traffic Project is an underground automated people mover that serves the central business district of Zhujiang New Town. It is commonly known as Zhujiang New Town Automated People Mover System or the APM for short. The operation started on 8 November 2010 with Canton Tower Station named Chigang Pagoda Station until December 2013. The stations of Haixinsha and Chigang Pagoda remained closed during the 2010 Asian Games. Chigang Pagoda Station opened on 28 November 2010, one day after the Asian Games ended; Haixinsha Station remained unopened until 24 February 2011. There is no direct platform-to-platform connection between the APM and Line 3 albeit they share the stations of Linhexi and Canton Tower. Transfer passengers need to exit and reenter with a new ticket. The APM runs two-car rubber-wheeled driverless trains.

Network expansion

Short-term planning

Long-term planning 
The Guangzhou Urban Rail Transit Network Planning Scheme (2018-2035), which was approved by the Guangzhou Municipal Government in November 2020, shows that a total of 53 metro lines and 2,029 km are planned in Guangzhou. This round of line network planning is divided into three levels: high-speed metro, rapid metro, and regular-speed metro. Among them, there are 5 high-speed metro lines with 452 km in Guangzhou, 11 rapid metro lines with 607 km in Guangzhou, and 37 regular-speed metro lines with 970 km.

 High-speed metro lines:
 : Knowledge City – Luogang – Zini (→ Foshan)
 : (Zhongshan / Zhuhai →) Shiliuchong – Huachengjie (→ Qingyuan)
 : Airport North – Nansha Passenger Port (→ Dongguan)
 : (Foshan →) Fangcun – Xintang (→ Dongguan)
  spur line: Xintang – Guangzhou Huali College (→ Huizhou)
 : Guangzhou East railway station – Liangkou (→ Xinfeng)
 Rapid metro lines:
 : Airport North – Haiou Island
  parallel express line: Pazhou – Jiaomen
 : Shuixibei – Meidi Dadao
 : Chaoyang – Xinsha
 : Guangzhou railway station – Dongfeng
 : Xintang – Lichengbei
 : Tianhe Park – Guangzhou Huali College
 : Guangzhou North railway station – Lijiao
 : Longxi – Huangpu Passenger Port
 : Taihe – Lanhe (→ Foshan)
 : Xinhe – Jiangnan (→ Dongguan)
 : Huangpu railway station – Huadu Square
 Regular-speed metro lines:
 : Xilang – Guangzhou East railway station
 : Jiahewanggang – Guangzhou South railway station
 : Huangcun – Nansha Passenger Port
 : Jiaokou – Huangpu Passenger Port
 : Xunfenggang – Guangzhou Middle School
 : Jiangfu – Haibang
 : Tanzhonglu – Gaozeng
 : Gaotangshi – Guanggang New Town (→ Foshan)
 : Guangzhou railway station – Pazhou – Guangzhou railway station
 Regular-speed metro lines (continued):
 : Xunfenggang – Higher Education Mega Center South
  spur line: Higher Education Mega Center North – Chenbian
 : Jiaomen – Nansha Passenger Port – Jiaomen
 : Huangpu railway station – Nanpuxi (→ Foshan)
 : Lingnan Square – Jiangnan
 : Chishajiao – Xintang Dadao
 : Guangzhoudadaobei – Education Park
 : Dongchong Town – Nansha Wetland Park
 : Nanguolu – Information Technology Park
 : Ronggui Railway Station – Qingshengdong
 : (Foshan →) Huangjinwei – Toubei
 : Dongjing – Huadong Coach Terminal
 : Fengcun – Baishantang
 : Lianxidadao – Shiliuchong
 : Jiahewanggang – Datian
 : Shihua – Changping
  spur line: Yonghe – Lihu
 : Bicun – Fangshi
 : Aotou – Conghua Coach Terminal
 : Nanjiao – GAC Base
 Foshan : (Foshan →) Guangzhou South Railway Station
 Foshan : (Foshan →) Xingyedadao
 Foshan : (Foshan →) Guangzhou Railway Station
 Foshan : (Foshan →) Baiyun Dongping
 Foshan : (Foshan →) Longxi
 Foshan : (Foshan →) Fangcun
 Foshan : (Foshan →) Hedongdong
 Dongguan : Huangpu Passenger Port (→ Dongguan)
 Dongguan : Zengcheng Railway Station (→ Dongguan)
 Dongguan : Shiqi (→ Dongguan)

Connections to neighboring cities 
The Guangzhou Metro is actively constructing connections to neighboring cities. Foshan is already connected via the Guangfo Metro with connections via Line 7 and Foshan Metro Line 2 is now opened. Dongguan city is proposing connections with Guangzhou Metro Line 13 and the Dongguan Metro. Neighboring Huizhou city proposed in 2016 that Guangzhou Metro Line 16 be extended into Longmen County, achieving the integration of Huizhou and Guangzhou. In January 2018, Huizhou's mayor Mai Jiaomeng revealed that Huizhou was studying two connections with the Guangzhou Metro with Line 16 heading to Yonghan Town, Longmen County and Line 21 extended to Mount Luofu in Boluo County. In 2018, Guangzhou is studying the feasibility of extending Line 18 south into Zhongshan and north into Qingyuan.

Guangzhou–Foshan metro connections

Fares and tickets

Fares 
Fares of Guangzhou Metro currently range from ¥2 (a couple of stations) to ¥22 (the longest journeys). A journey shorter than 4 km costs ¥2; ¥1 is charged for every 4 km after 4 km, every 6 km after 12 km, and every 8 km after 24 km. Between 30 October 2010 and 30 October 2011, an additional, undiscountable ¥5 fee was charged for any journey to or from Airport South. Collection of such a fee was approved for one year in July 2010 and expired without extension. The fare for the longest possible journey to the exiting station will be charged if a journey exceeds four hours. Passengers may carry luggage below weight and size limits at no cost or a ¥2 surcharge.

Current ticket types

Single journey ticket 

Single journey tickets can be bought at a kiosk at every station or at the automatic ticket vending machines. The ticket itself is a contactless radio-frequency plastic token. The user has to tap it on the sensor on the ticket barrier when entering and insert it into a slot at the exit gate where the token is reclaimed. Full base fares are charged for single journey tickets for individuals. Passengers travelling in groups of 30 or larger can enjoy a 10% discount.

Yang Cheng Tong and Lingnan Pass 
Yang Cheng Tong is a contactless smartcard which can be used on the metro and most other forms of public transport in Guangzhou.

Yang Cheng Tong offers discounts for rides on buses and the metro. Within each month, bus and metro rides combined, a 5% discount is available for the first 15 journeys and a 40% discount for all journeys beyond.
Full-time students enrolled in primary, secondary, and vocational schools can apply for student passes, which allow them bus and metro rides at half price. Senior citizens can also obtain special passes. Half price is charged for seniors aged 60–64. Seniors aged 65 and above as well as people with major disabilities ride free of charge.

Yang Cheng Tong was rebranded in November 2010 as a type of Lingnan Pass, a new transport card that is valid in multiple cities across the Pearl River Delta. Lingnan Pass cards issued in Guangzhou are named Lingnan Pass·Yang Cheng Tong. Existing cards were automatically upgraded and need not be replaced.

Day pass 

Guangzhou Metro introduced day passes on 1 January 2013. A day pass holder can travel an unlimited number of times in the metro system during a limited period of validity starting from the first use. Two variants are currently available:

 One-day pass: ¥20 each and valid for 24 hours
 Three-day pass: ¥50 each and valid for 72 hours

Day passes are not rechargeable. They can be fully refunded until the first use, at which time they become nonrefundable. Used passes are not reclaimed, although they can be voluntarily recycled at drop boxes in the stations.

The passes are decorated with illustrations of the Cantonese language and cuisine to promote the local culture. The art design was favored by over 70% of those who responded to public opinion surveys compared to two other competing designs.

Discontinued ticket types 
Guangzhou Metro discontinued the following ticket types in favor of Yang Cheng Tong.

Stored value ticket 

Stored value tickets were very similar to Yang Cheng Tong. Stored value tickets are not on sale anymore, but they will be presented as souvenirs to VIPs at the activities of the subway company and can have a 5% discount on fares.

Monthly pass 
Monthly passes were introduced on 1 November 2008 and abolished on 1 May 2010. There were three types of monthly pass:

 ¥55 monthly pass for 20 single journeys
 ¥88 monthly pass for 35 single journeys
 ¥115 monthly pass for 50 single journeys

Each journey could travel from one station to any other station regardless of distance. A monthly pass was valid within a calendar month, not the one-month period from the first day it was used. Unused journeys in a month could not be rolled over to a pass for the following month.

Student pass and senior citizen pass 
Both were issued by the metro company and used on metro only, allowing the holders to travel free or at half price.

Power supply 
For power transmission, lines 1, 2, 3, 7, 8, 9 and 13 as well as Guangfo Line use overhead lines, while lines 4, 5, 6, 14 and 21 use third rails. In contrast to the heavy-rail lines, the light-rail APM runs on 600 V 50 Hz 3-phase AC supplied by third rails.

Controversies

Free rides for relatives of metro employees 
Starting from 1997 (Guangzhou Metro) implemented a policy that allowed free rides for, in addition to its employees, their relatives. The policy was exposed to the public after its validity was questioned at a hearing on metro fares in December 2005. At first, it was reported that up to three lineal kins of each metro employee were allowed free access to the metro. Based on Guangzhou Metro having about 6,000 employees at the time, participants of the hearing estimated that up to 18,000 relatives of metro employees could ride free at an approximate cost of ¥13 million per year.

In response to questions on the policy raised at the hearing, Lu Guanglin, then-General Manager of Guangzhou Metro, claimed that relatives of employees with free access would volunteer as security personnel of the metro. He cited counter-terrorism when explaining that the policy was not exclusively an employee benefit but also a safety measure. Guangzhou Metro later clarified that only the spouse and at most one pre-college child under 18 of each employee were allowed free access, limiting the number of such people to about 2,000. Free rides were strictly regulated and tracked, with abuse subject to disciplinary actions. An unnamed metro employee estimated that the actual cost per year was ¥3 million rather than ¥13 million.

Following its publicity, the policy sparked widespread criticism. A Nanfang Daily editorial criticised the policy as Guangzhou Metro exploiting public resources to its own interests. It also questioned the competence of relatives of metro employees in counter-terrorism. It further argued that if Guangzhou Metro indeed needed voluntary security personnel, it could have recruited them openly from the public. Such criticism was echoed by hearing participants as well as members of the Municipal People's Congress of Guangzhou. Guangzhou Metro officially abandoned the policy under pressure on 16 December 2005.

Ridership under-prediction 
The first lines that were constructed, such as Lines 1, 2, and 8, used high capacity 6 car A-type trains in anticipation to heavy ridership. This choice later proved invaluable in the densely populated Guangzhou with all three aforementioned lines today having a peak daily usage of over 1 million passengers each. However, in the early days of operation, ridership of these lines was low. Ridership for Line 1 plateaued at – in the late 1990s and early 2000s even though it was projected to reach  in 1998. The under utilization of these lines at the time allowed experts to insist using lower capacity trains on newer lines and even led to the Guangzhou government being criticized for overinflating ridership predictions to approve metro projects. Preference was given small-capacity trains and low-headway operation in the planning of later projects such as Lines 3, 5 and 6. Line 3 was to be built using smaller, lower capacity B-type rolling stock while Lines 5 and 6 was planned to use even lower capacity light metro four car L-type trains.

Initially the trains of Line 3 would only be three cars long and planned to gradually be extended into six car trains in the long-term future. This was in line with the conservative ridership projections at the time, with the Airport Section of Line 3 predicted in 2007 to have a long term peak demand of just over 20,000 pphpd by 2034. These ideas would soon prove utterly shortsighted with Line 3 trains being plagued with extreme overcrowding with significant sections of the line over 100% capacity only a few years after opening. Line 3 was forced to adopt its final long term configuration of six-car trains and low headway operation only five years after opening. However, as of 2014, with continuing growth in passenger demand, many sections of Line 3 are still over 100% capacity even after conversion to six car trains and low headway operation. The section crossing the Pearl River between Kecun and Canton Tower stations is the most congested, reaching 136% capacity. In June 2017, the ridership of Line 3 averaged over 2 million passengers per day and on 1 March 2019 the line carried 2.54 million passengers in a single day. With the busiest section carrying over 60,000 pphpd of passenger volume in 2018.

As the controversy surrounding Line 3 unfolded the low capacity design of Line 6, another downscaled line, drew concentrated but late criticism from local media in July 2009. Such projections were in line with ridership of the, at the time, underutilized Lines 1 and Line 2 prior to 2004. However, with the construction of Line 6 well underway using the original plan of four car L-type trains, a change to longer trains had become unrealistic as it would require modification to stations structures whose construction had been completed. An internal report of Guangzhou Metro also released in 2009 reckoned that using the same six car B-type rolling stock as Lines 3 and 7 would increase the capacity of Line 6 by 50%. Land expropriation and residence relocation would pose even greater challenges as evidenced by severe delays in the construction of the stations of Yide Lu and Shahe. In 2014, one year after opening, daily ridership on Line 6 has grown to 600,000 and continues to increase steadily, peaking at 858,000 passengers on 16 September 2016, a mere two years later. With the opening of Phase II extending the line from Changban to Xiangxue in late 2016 ridership continues to increase, averaging 850,000 passengers per day as of April 2018.

The congestion following the openings of Lines 3 and 6 made a profound impact on the planning and design of metro lines in Guangzhou. Line 5 had an urgent revision during early construction to support longer six car trains but still using a low capacity L-type design. Lines 7 was originally also planned to use the same four car light metro design as Line 6 but was redesigned and constructed to use higher capacity six car B-type trains. Before the opening of Line 6, the mayor of Guangzhou Chen Jianhua publicly admitted that planning of Line 6 lacked foresight and ridership estimates were too conservative. He predicts the line would be very crowded upon opening. He promised to ensure that future lines will be designed to use trains that are six or more cars long. Newer lines around the city center such as the under construction Line 11, Line 12 and in operation Line 13 will all use high capacity eight car A-type trains.

Quality inspection of Line 3 north extension

Exposure of quality issue 
On 11 October 2010, news broke that the concrete structures of two connecting passages in the north extension of Line 3 between Jiahewanggang and Longgui had substandard compressive strength. The quality of the two connecting passages was found to be questionable as early as August 2009. But it not was brought to light until a technician who worked for a company that inspected their quality posted scanned copies of the original inspection reports in his blog in August 2010, and the media picked up the story in October 2010.

The connecting passages were intended as connections between two metro tunnels for the maintenance crew and emergency escape corridors for passengers. Their compressive strength was designed to reach 30 MPa. However, the lowest values measured in two inspections were only 21.9 MPa and 25.5 MPa, respectively. Guangzhou Metro and Beijing Chang Cheng Bilfinger Berger Construction Engineering Co., Ltd. (BCBB), contractor of the Jiahewanggang–Longgui section, commissioned two inspection companies to perform a total of three inspections. All three inspections reported results below standard. According to the technician who disclosed the issue and another technician who participated in the first inspection, possible consequences of weaker-than-standard concrete structures included collapse of the passages, blockage of groundwater drains, and even paralysation of the metro tunnels.

Alleged fraud attempts 
According to the two technicians, BCBB rejected a negative inspection report and conspired with their employer company to produce a fraudulent positive report. In response, both the inspection company and BCBB denied their involvement in any fraud attempts. Su Zhenyu, a deputy manager of the Quality and Safety Division of Guangzhou Metro, admitted the quality issue with the connecting passages but maintained the innocence of Guangzhou Metro. According to him (Guangzhou Metro) never received the original inspection reports in 2009 and was unaware of the issue until it received them on 30 September 2010. Su blamed the incident on deceit by BCBB and declared the structures safe for train operation. Su's comments were acknowledged by Guangzhou Metro.

Reactions 
According to Su (Guangzhou Metro) had launched an investigation into the incident and demanded remedial plans for fortifying the structures from the designer after its experts verified that the quality of the passage did not meet the design standard. In its official response (Guangzhou Metro) claimed that it had been monitoring the connecting passages since they were completed in August 2009 and noticed no cracks, deformation or leaks. It also commissioned a re-inspection in September 2010 and obtained results comparable to previous ones. Evaluation by the designer of the connecting passages based on these results recognised their structures as safe. Previously in 2009, the designer also evaluated one of the two connecting passages as safe upon demand of BCBB with the standard for its compressive strength at the lowest permissible value of 25 MPa.

In the wake of widespread media coverage, the Construction Commission of Guangzhou launched an investigation into the incident. The commission invited an independent expert group to inspect the connecting passages. The expert group reaffirmed that despite their quality was indeed below the design standard, the passages were safe for operation and needed not be strengthened or rebuilt. The commission also confirmed that BCBB violated regulations in concealing negative inspection reports from related parties. The cause of weaker-than-standard concrete structures was blamed by deputy mayor Su Zequn on cement being mixed manually instead of using machinery due to space limitation at the construction site.

The scheduled opening of the north extension of Line 3 on 30 October 2010 was eventually unaffected.

Universal free access in November 2010 
In January 2010, then-mayor Zhang Guangning revealed to the media that the local government was considering rewarding residents with an "Asian Games gift package" in acknowledgement of their support for the Games. On 27 September 2010, contents of the gift package were officially announced. Included was universal free access to public transit on 30 workdays in November and December 2010 that would coincide with the schedules of the 2010 Asian Games and Asian Para Games in urban areas excluding the districts of Panyu, Nansha and Huadu and the cities of Zengcheng and Conghua. The measure was intended to compensate for the inconvenience caused by a temporary traffic rule that would ban cars from the streets by the parity of the last digits of their license plates during the Games.

The free rides policy prompted unprecedented enthusiasm from local residents on 1 November 2010, the first day it went into effect. The metro system carried 7.80 million rides, doubling the figure of an average day. Ridership of the day exceeded the previous peak of 5.13 million on National Day 1 October 2010 by a significant margin and set a national record. Metro traffic remained intense in the days that followed. The daily ridership record was refreshed twice on 3 and 5 November 2010, reaching 7.844 million; total ridership amounted to 38.77 million over the entire workweek. Provisional flow control measures were put into force at all stations, but were utterly inadequate to contain traffic far beyond the design capacity of the metro system. Trains were often crammed, and stations were filled with people queuing in swarms to take a free ride. Guangzhou Metro estimated that when the Asian Games opened, daily ridership would surpass 8 million.

Five days after the free rides policy came into force, local authorities decided to rescind the free public transit offer starting from 8 November 2010 and replace it with a cash subsidy program as they deemed the enormous public response a potential security threat to the Games. Registered households and migrant households with presence in the city longer than half a year would each receive a public transit subsidy of ¥150 in cash; individuals in corporate households would each receive ¥50. Residents could claim the subsidies between 12 January and 31 March 2011. Public transit discount policies that were in effect before November 2010 remained unchanged.

Kangwang Lu sinkhole incident 
Six collapses occurred within 40 minutes. Two more collapses occurred later at 21:45, when workers were pouring concrete into the sinkhole. Nearby roads were immediately closed for emergency engineering. The affected section of Kangwang Lu remained closed until the Spring Festival holidays and was closed for a second time on 12 February due to discovery of additional risks.

There were no casualties in the incident because metro construction workers detected geological anomalies 20 minutes before the initial collapse and promptly evacuated the neighbourhood. The sinkhole caused disruptions to electricity, gas and water supplies and drainage pipelines. Preliminary analysis blamed the incident on inaccurate geological drawings used for underground blast operations. In total, 412 households, 103 businesses and 69 warehouses were evacuated, and 257 residents were relocated. Guangzhou Metro offered provisional compensations that amounted to ¥50,000 for each collapsed business and ¥2600 for each resident of the collapsed houses, among other compensations.

Overseas Business 
On February 25, 2020, the Guangzhou Metro Group and the Punjab Provincial Public Transport Authority of Pakistan signed a service contract for the operation and maintenance of the Orange Line of the Lahore Metro in Pakistan.  The bid-winning consortium will undertake the operation and maintenance of the Lahore Metro Orange Line for 8 years.

See also 
 List of Guangzhou Metro lines & stations
 Foshan Metro (FMetro)
 Dongguan Rail Transit
 List of rapid transit systems
 Metro systems by annual passenger rides

Notes

References

Bibliography

External links 

 
 Guangzhou at UrbanRail.net
 Guangzhou Metro route map and trip planner
 Official Guangzhou Metro Model Train
 Travel China Guide

 
1500 V DC railway electrification
1997 establishments in China
Projects established in 1958
Rail transport in Guangdong
Railway lines opened in 1997
Rapid transit in China
Underground rapid transit in China